
Gmina Rzgów is a rural gmina (administrative district) in Konin County, Greater Poland Voivodeship, in west-central Poland.

The gmina contains part of the protected area called Warta Landscape Park.

Villages
Gmina Rzgów contains the villages and settlements of Babia, Barłogi, Błonice, Bobrowo, Bożatki, Branno, Dąbrowica, Goździków, Grabienice, Józefowo, Kowalewek, Kurów, Mądroszki, Modła, Osiecza Druga, Osiecza Pierwsza, Rzgów Drugi, Rzgów Pierwszy, Sławsk, Świątniki, Witnica, Wojciechowo, Zarzew, Zarzewek and Zastruże.

Neighbouring gminas
Gmina Rzgów is bordered by the gminas of Golina, Grodziec, Lądek, Rychwał, Stare Miasto and Zagórów.

References
Polish official population figures 2006

Rzgow
Konin County